South African Argentines are Argentine citizens of South African descent or South African-born people residing in Argentina.

South African immigration to Argentina (also referred to as "Boer Colonization in Argentina") is the settlement of people from South Africa in Argentina, mainly by Afrikaners. This settlement began from 4 June 1902 onwards. Most of them (including a handful of coloured servants) settled in Chubut Province, southern Argentina. The main cities where they settled was Sarmiento in Chubut.

South African settlers who arrived in Argentina, were entirely of Boer origin. Today the Afrikaans language remains, although is only spoken by around 300 people.

This South American country was chosen by many South Africans to emigrate because of facilities to settle.

History 
Between 1902 and 1907/08 about 600 to 650 Boer settlers came to Argentina. These Boers were descendants of Dutch and French settlers of South Africa (also called Afrikaners). They came mostly from the Transvaal Province and Orange Free State.  Most left South Africa following the Second Anglo-Boer War as many had lost their farms in the war or regarded themselves as Bittereinders who felt they could not live under a British government.

To migrate to the Argentine Patagonia region, the settlers sent two representatives to Comodoro Rivadavia (Louis Baumann and Camillo Ricchiardi), Chubut Province, to manage the establishment of the new colony. They were greeted by Francisco Pietrobelli, with whom toured the region, and called for the government land. They came on British cargo ships with bullock carts (ox wagons) and the national government provided them mules and tents. The distribution of land was authorized by then President Julio Argentino Roca and the Minister of Agriculture, Wenceslao Escalante, who was honoured with the name of the colony and, later, the department where it is located.

Notable people
 Emanuel Ntaka (born 1977), pop singer and activist

See also 
 Afrikaner
 Dutch Argentine
 Argentines of European descent
 Argentina–South Africa relations

Further reading 
 Brian Murray du Toit: Colonia Boer, an Afrikaner Settlement in Chubut. Argentina 1995, 
 Christiaan Johannes Scheepers Strydom: Afrikaners in die vreemde (Die Afrikaner en sy kultuur, deel 5) (Afrikaners abroad; the Afrikaner and his culture, part 5). Cape Town, 1976: Tafelberg Uitgewers (in Afrikaans)
Pieter Hendrik Henning: 'N Boer in Argentinië. Cape Town, 1943: Nasionale Pers (in Afrikaans)

References 

 
Chubut Province